Isla Pucú is a small town and district in the Cordillera Department of Paraguay. Its people are usually farmers. Technology is taking place rapidly and it is getting to be a more sophisticated place, because many of the young people are migrating to North America and Spain, to help their families economically.

Districts of Cordillera Department